Spirit is This Condition's third EP, a five-track album recorded in April 2010.  It was released on July 27, 2010 through online retailers and digital music stores (iTunes), as well as a physical release through the band's online merchandise store.  Recorded in Boonton, NJ's The Pilot Studio with producer Rob Freeman, whom the band had worked with on three singles in 2009, the album features five new tracks, including "Go" and "Stay Right Here".

Tracks
"Stay Right Here" - 3:43
"Lost" - 3:47
"She Loves Me" - 3:25
"Go" - 3:56
"I Think I Like You" - 3:21

Personnel

Band members
Nathen Cyphert – Vocals, Acoustic Guitar
Mike McGovern - Guitar, Mandolin
Nick Cantatore – Bass
Devin Passariello – Drums
Stephen Conley - Guitar, Backing Vocals

Production
Produced and Mixed by Rob Freeman
Mastered by Mike Fossenkemper

Additional Performers
Trumpet on 'I Think I Like You' performed by Andrew Cramb

All songs written and performed by This Condition

References

External links
Official This Condition Website

2010 EPs
This Condition albums